This is a list of public art in Bartholomew County, Indiana.

This list applies only to works of public art accessible in an outdoor public space. For example, this does not include artwork visible inside a museum.

Columbus

Edinburgh

Taylorsville

See also

List of public art in Indiana

Notes

Bartholomew County
Public art in Columbus, Indiana
Outdoor sculptures in Indiana